First Lady is a 1937 film about behind-the-scenes political maneuverings in Washington, D.C. directed by Stanley Logan and starring Kay Francis, Preston Foster, Anita Louise, Walter Connolly and Verree Teasdale. Francis and Teasdale portray bitter rivals in their pursuit of the titular role of First Lady. The picture is based on the 1935 play of the same name by George S. Kaufman and Katharine Dayton.

Plot
The granddaughter of a President of the United States, Lucy Chase Wayne (Kay Francis) discreetly campaigns to gain the presidential nomination for her beloved husband, Secretary of State Stephen Wayne (Preston Foster). She tries to gain the support of rising Senator Gordon Keane (Victor Jory), a victory that would be doubly sweet inasmuch as he is the protégé of her despised arch-rival, Irene Hibbard (Verree Teasdale).

Lucy becomes concerned when rumors reach her that Irene intends to divorce her boring Supreme Court Justice spouse, Carter (Walter Connolly), marry Keane, and try to get him elected president. She concocts a scheme to deceive Irene into believing that Carter will be her party's candidate in the upcoming election (when she knows that he has no chance whatsoever) and force Irene to abort her own plans. Lucy convinces Lavinia Mae Creevey (Louise Fazenda), the narrow-minded, provincial leader of an organization of five million women, to back Carter. To Lucy's horror, newspaper magnate Ellsworth T. Banning (Grant Mitchell) adds his support, and Carter is indeed offered the nomination.

Lucy learns that Prince Boris Gregoravitch (Gregory Gaye), Irene's ex-husband, is in Washington for negotiations. Learning something interesting from the prince, she has her husband invite the foreign envoy to the dinner in which Carter is to announce his acceptance of the nomination. Gregoravitch is delighted to see Irene and gives her some "good" news. On behalf of his country, he has reached an agreement with the United States in which both sides will recognize each other's laws. Once the treaty is signed, he and Irene will be considered divorced by the American legal system. Until then however, Irene is technically a bigamist. Lucy blackmails Irene into getting Carter to decline the nomination, leaving the way free for her husband.

Cast

 Kay Francis as Lucy Chase Wayne
 Preston Foster as Stephen Wayne
 Anita Louise as Emmy Page, Lucy's niece
 Walter Connolly as Carter Hibbard
 Verree Teasdale as Irene Hibbard
 Victor Jory as Senator Gordon Keane
 Marjorie Rambeau as Belle Hardwick
 Marjorie Gateson as Sophy Prescott
 Louise Fazenda as Lavinia Mae Creevey
 Henry O'Neill as Judge George Mason
 Grant Mitchell as Ellsworth T. Banning
 Eric Stanley as Senator Tom Hardwicke
 Lucile Gleason as Mrs. Mary Ives (as Lucille Gleason)
 Sara Haden as Mrs. Mason
 Harry Davenport as Charles
 Gregory Gaye as Prince Boris Gregoravitch
 Olaf Hytten as Bleeker

See also
 Rachel Jackson, who married future President Andrew Jackson in the mistaken belief that she was divorced

Reception
Frank S. Nugent of The New York Times wrote that the film had "a number of superb minor performances," but "was still a talkative piece which only crosses the threshold of one drawing room to pull up before the fireplace of another. But the talk is good, if small; and if small, at least it stings." Variety called it "amusing, if somewhat chatty" with an "excellent cast, good direction and tasteful production". Harrison's Reports found the film "extremely well acted" and "good entertainment for high-class audiences", but thought that some of the subtle comedy "may go over the head of the ordinary picture-goer." John Mosher of The New Yorker called the film "lively" and was "delighted" by several of the performances.

According to Warner Bros records the film only earned $322,000 in the US and Canada and $102,000 elsewhere.

References

External links

 
 
 
 

1937 films
American black-and-white films
American films based on plays
American political comedy films
Films about fictional presidents of the United States
1930s political films
1937 comedy films
Films directed by Stanley Logan
1930s American films